USS Stark (FFG-31) was the 23rd ship of the  of guided-missile frigates and was named after Admiral Harold Rainsford Stark (1880–1972). Ordered from Todd Pacific Shipyards in Seattle, Washington, on 23 January 1978, Stark was laid down on 24 August 1979, launched on 30 May 1980, and commissioned on 23 October 1982 with CDR Terence W. Costello commanding. In 1987, an Iraqi jet fired two missiles at Stark, killing 37 U.S. sailors on board. Decommissioned on 7 May 1999, Stark was scrapped in 2006.

Missile attack

USS Stark was deployed to the Middle East Force in 1984 and 1987. Captain Glenn R. Brindel was the commanding officer during the 1987 deployment. The ship was struck on 17 May 1987 by two Exocet anti-ship missiles during the Iran–Iraq War fired from an Iraqi aircraft officially identified as a Dassault Mirage F1 fighter, The Reagan administration attributed the blame to Iran for its alleged belligerence in the underlying conflict. The plane had taken off from Shaibah, Iraq at 20:00 and had flown south into the Persian Gulf. The frigate did not detect the missiles with radar; warning was given by the lookout only moments before the missiles struck. The first penetrated the port-side hull and failed to detonate, but left flaming rocket fuel in its path. The second entered at almost the same point, and, leaving a  gash, exploded in crew quarters. The missiles killed 37 sailors and injured 21.

No weapons were fired in defense of Stark. The autonomous Phalanx CIWS remained in standby mode, Mark 36 SRBOC countermeasures were not armed until seconds before the missile hit. The attacking Exocet missiles and Mirage aircraft were in a blindspot of the STIR fire control director (Separate tracking and illumination Radar, part of the Mk 92 Guided Missile Fire Control System), and the Oto Melara Mk 75 76 mm/62 caliber naval gun, but in the clear for the MK 92 CAS (Combined Antenna System, primary search and tracking radar of the Mk 92 Guided Missile Fire Control System) and the Mk 13 Mod 4 single-arm launcher.  The ship failed to maneuver to bring its Mk 75 to bear before the first missile hit.

On fire and listing, the frigate was brought under control by its crew during the night. The ship made its way to Bahrain where, after temporary repairs by the destroyer tender  to make her seaworthy, she returned to her home port of Naval Station Mayport, under her own power. The ship was eventually repaired at Ingalls Shipbuilding in Mississippi for $142 million.

It is unknown whether Iraqi leaders authorized the attack. Initial claims by the Iraqi government (that Stark was inside the Iran–Iraq War zone) were shown to be false. The motives and orders of the pilot remain unanswered. American officials have claimed he was executed, but an ex-Iraqi Air Force commander later said that the pilot who attacked Stark was not punished, and remained alive. According to Jean-Louis Bernard, author of "Heroes of Bagdad" T1 (Editions JPO 2017), the pilot, Abdul Rhaman, not only was not punished, but would have received the medal of bravery at the end of 'a joint Iraqi-American commission of inquiry. His subsequent defection is not mentioned in this book. Jean-Louis Bernard also confirms the use of a Falcon 50 during this action.
Citing lapses in training requirements and lax procedures, the U.S. Navy's board of inquiry relieved Captain Brindel of command and recommended him for court-martial, along with tactical action officer Lieutenant Basil E. Moncrief. Instead, Brindel and Moncrief received non-judicial punishment from Admiral Frank B. Kelso II and letters of reprimand. Brindel opted for early retirement while Moncrief resigned his commission after only eight years of service. The executive officer, Lieutenant Commander Raymond Gajan Jr., was detached for cause and received a letter of admonition.

1990s
Stark was part of the Standing Naval Forces Atlantic Fleet in 1990 before returning to the Middle East Force in 1991. Stark was attached to UNITAS in 1993 and took part in Operation Uphold Democracy and Operation Able Vigil in 1994. In 1995, Stark returned to the Middle East Force before serving with the Standing Naval Forces, Atlantic (STANAVFORLANT) in 1997 and in 1998.

Stark was decommissioned on 7 May 1999. A scrapping contract was awarded to Metro Machine Corp. of Philadelphia, Pennsylvania, on 7 October 2005. The ship was reported scrapped on 21 June 2006. Her stern plate was saved and donated to Naval Station Mayport.

References

Further reading

External links

Photos of the damaged Stark
Host page for PDF version of report: Formal Investigation into the Circumstances Surrounding the Attack of the USS Stark in 1987
US Navy's Damage Control Museum page on the USS Stark

Information on Operation Earnest Will 
MaritimeQuest USS Stark FFG-31 pages
NPR's interview with OS2 Gable. Aired 15 May 2008. 
NPR's interview with Michael Tooker. Aired 9 June 2008. 

 

United States Navy in the 20th century
Iraq–United States relations
1980 ships
Oliver Hazard Perry-class frigates of the United States Navy
Combat incidents
Ships built in Seattle
Cold War frigates and destroyer escorts of the United States